Dyschromatosis universalis hereditaria is a rare genodermatosis characterized by reticulate hyper- and hypo- pigmentated macules in a generalized distribution.

Both autosomal dominant and recessive inheritance have been reported with the disorder.

It has been associated with mutations in genes SASH1 and ABCB6.

References

External links 

  Dyschromatosis universalis hereditaria: Two cases, Dermatology Online Journal.

Genodermatoses
Disturbances of human pigmentation